The Sound Providers are a jazz rap duo formed by producers Jason Skills and Soulo. Formed in 1998 in San Diego, California, it originally included a third member, an MC named Profile, who left the group shortly after they were signed by ABB Records. The Sound Providers produced a number of singles before releasing their debut album An Evening with The Sound Providers, recorded and produced in San Diego and Los Angeles, in 2004 on ABB Records. The group has collaborated with Asheru, The Procussions, Wee Bee Foolish, Maspyke and Little Brother, who all made contributions to the album.

In early 2006 they released another album entitled Looking Backwards: 2001 - 1998, which is a compilation of earlier songs made when Profile was still a member of the group. These songs were previously available only as 12" singles.  The album also includes a number of radio promos and other beats and songs which had not been released.

In 2006 The SPs remixed the Kero One track Give Thanks featuring Niamaj.  The remix was released as a B-side to Kero One's In All The Wrong Places single.

In 2006 The Pros also completed a full-length album with an emcee from Tampa, Florida named Surreal. The album is entitled True Indeed, and the first single "Just gettin started" b/w "Place to be" was released in June of the same year. The full-length album was released on 14 November 2006 on Quarternote/ABB Records.

The Sound Providers sound is predominantly jazz orientated hip hop, though their work can consist of a much wider array of genres. Their style is a mix of socially conscious lyrics with new school rap beats, with samples taken from jazz, funk, and reggae.  They have cited artists such as Gang Starr and the Native Tongues Posse as influences for their work.

Discography 

Albums

 True Indeed (With Surreal) (Quarternote/ABB Records, 2006)
 Looking Backwards: 2001 - 1998 (Quarternote/ABB Records, 2006)
 An Evening with The Sound Providers (Quarternote/ABB Records, 2004)

Singles

 Nuff said (2007)
 Just Gettin' Started (2006)
 Its Gonna Bee Part II (featuring Wee Bee Foolish) (2005)
 The Blessin (featuring Blest) (2004)
 For Old Times Sake (featuring Asheru of Unspoken Heard) (2004)
 Street Keys / Apples (2004) (Limited edition 7")
 The Throwback (featuring Maspyke) (2004)
 Who Am I (featuring Grap Luva) (2001)
 The Difference (2000)
 Get Down (1999)
 Dope Transmission (1998)

References

External links 

The Find Magazine: Interview (2010) with Soulo of The Sound Providers
MobileUnderground on An Evening with the Sound Providers
Paris Etudiant on An Evening with the Sound Providers (in French)

American hip hop groups
American musical duos